The CMA CGM Zephyr class is a series of 5 container ships being built for CMA CGM. The ships were built by Shanghai Jiangnan Changxing Shipbuilding in China. The ships have a maximum theoretical capacity of around 15,536 twenty-foot equivalent units (TEU).

List of ships

References 

Container ship classes